Altin Kosh (also Romanized as Āltīn Kosh, Altūnkosh, and Altunkush) is a village in Khandan Rural District, Tarom Sofla District, Qazvin County, Qazvin Province, Iran. At the 2006 census, its population was 973, in 256 families.

References 

Populated places in Qazvin County